Olimpiysky Stadium is a name of several stadiums.

 Olympic Stadium (Moscow), a stadium in Moscow, formerly Luzhniki Stadium
 Olimpiysky Stadium, a stadium in Kakhovka
 Olimpiyskyi National Sports Complex, a stadium in Kyiv
 RSC Olimpiyskiy (Regional Sports Complex), a stadium in Donetsk